Angelina Pwerle (pronounced 'Pull-uh') is an Australian Indigenous artist, born c. 1946 in the Utopia region of Central Australia. Her work is held by the Metropolitan Museum of Art, the National Gallery of Australia and others.

Early life 
Angelina Pwerle was born at the Utopia homestead, about 250 kilometres northeast of Alice Springs, more than 25 years before the pastoral property was returned to its traditional owners.

Work 

Angelina Pwerle began working with batik in 1977 under the instruction of Yipati Kuyata, a Pitjantjatjara artist from Ernabella. In 1986, she became a founding member of the Utopia Women’s Batik Group, alongside Emily Kame Kngwarreye and others. She took up the medium of acrylic paint on canvas in the Australian summer of 1988-9.

She has painted for Delmore Gallery since 1989.

Pwerle's first solo exhibition took place at Niagara Galleries in Melbourne in 1996. She continues to exhibit with the gallery, most recently with the show Bush Plum and Beyond in 2021. 

The work she has produced since 1989 can be divided into three main styles: abstract, naive and ritual. Her abstract paintings are composed of numerous tiny dots and can be described as pointillist works. Her naive paintings depict the Atham-areny spirit people. Her ritual work consists of woodcarvings that reflect her deep knowledge of ceremony.

Pwerle's work appeared in Hosfelt Gallery's 20th Anniversary Exhibition in San Francisco alongside works by Jean-Michel Basquiat and Ed Ruscha. She was the subject of solo shows at Hosfelt Gallery in 2013 and 2018.

Pwerle is the subject of the 2012 documentary film Bush Plum: The Contemporary Art of Angelina Pwerle.

Her work was featured in the exhibition Marking the Infinite: Contemporary Women Artists from Aboriginal Australia, which toured the United States and Canada in 2016–2019.

In the book published alongside the exhibition, curator Anne Marie Brody writes: "Pwerle's works are, like the late masterpieces of Mark Rothko or Claude Monet, deep crystallizations at the far frontier of creative endeavor."

Bush Plum paintings 

Pwerle's best-known works are a depiction of her country's Bush Plum (anwekety) Dreaming.

These canvases characteristically feature an intense concentration of tiny dots which, says curator Nici Cumpston, "gives the overall effect of a subtly textured, shimmering surface."

Pwerle uses a wooden skewer to make these minuscule marks on the surface of her canvases.

In 2022, National Gallery of Australia director Nick Mitzevich told the Financial Times: "The way her practice has developed is extraordinary. She has refined the Central Desert dotting technique and used it to create abstract visions that are quite distinct from those made by her contemporaries."

Writing in The Monthly, Patrick Witton describes a Bush Plum composition as “a constellation of minute dots that cluster and crack forth across the canvas, capturing at once the granular and the expansive.” 

Pwerle herself describes her practice as "a constant engagement" and "a spiritual connection to place."

Works in major collections 
Institutions that hold two or more works by Pwerle include:

 Metropolitan Museum of Art
 National Gallery of Australia
 Fine Arts Museums of San Francisco
 National Gallery of Victoria
 Art Gallery of New South Wales
 Art Gallery of South Australia

Personal life 
Pwerle speaks only her native Anmatyerre and rarely leaves the Utopia region.

She is also sometimes known by the first name Angeline and the surnames Ngal, Ngale and Kngale. There is some dispute amongst Australian art dealers about which names are correct. However, most institutions, including the National Gallery of Australia and Sotheby's, now refer to her as Angelina Pwerle.

Speaking to Art Monthly Australasia in 2016, Pwerle herself explained: "Pwerle is the same as Ngale, just in another language." In Alyawarr country, Angelina is referred to as Pwerle, and in Anmatyerre country she is referred to as Ngale.

She is the younger sister of artists Kathleen Ngale and Polly Ngale.

External links
 Angelina Pwerle Archive

References 

Australian Aboriginal artists
Australian women painters
20th-century Australian women artists
21st-century Australian women artists
Artists from the Northern Territory
1940s births
Living people
Year of birth uncertain